La Tour, prends garde ! (La Tour, watch out!) is a 1958 French adventure drama film directed by Georges Lampin, written by Claude Accursi, starring Jean Marais. The film was known under the title "King on Horseback" (USA), "Des Königs bester Mann" (West Germany), "Killer Spy" (international English title).

Cast 
 Jean Marais : Henri La Tour
 Eleonora Rossi Drago : Countess Malvina of Amalfi
 Nadja Tiller : Mirabelle
 Cathia Caro : Antoinette de Saint-Sever "Toinon"
 Jean Parédès : Nicolas Taupin
 Renaud Mary : Pérouge
 Robert Dalban : Barberin
 Christian Duvaleix : Passelacet
 Yves Massard : Marquis François de Marmande
 Marcel Pérès : Chamonet
 Jean-Pierre Léaud : Pierrot
 Raoul Delfosse : Bravaccio
 Paul-Emile Deiber : Duc Philippe de Saint-Sever
 Jean Lara : Louis XV
 Sonia Hlebsova/Klebs : L'impératrice Marie-Thérèse d'Autriche
 Roger Saget : Maréchal de Noailles
 Liliane Bert : Duchesse de Châteauroux
 Jacques Marin : Aristide Cornilion (non crédité)
 Dominique Davray : Une invitée de Taupin (non créditée)
 Albert Michel : L'invité de Taupin (non crédité)
 Monette Dinay : Mme Taupin (non créditée)
 Albert Daumergue : Un policier du roi

References

External links 
 
 La Tour, prends garde! (1958) at the Films de France

1958 films
1950s adventure drama films
French adventure drama films
1950s French-language films
French black-and-white films
Films directed by Georges Lampin
Films set in the 1740s
Films set in Germany
Films set in France
1958 drama films
French swashbuckler films
1950s French films